Pocahontas County Courthouse and Jail is a historic courthouse and jail located at Marlinton, Pocahontas County, West Virginia. The courthouse was built in 1894, and is a 2 1/2-story, brick, Victorian Romanesque building with a stone raised basement level. It has irregular massing with a central block that has a steep hip roof. The front elevation features two towers, one at each corner. A courthouse annex building was added in 1976. The jail is a two-story brick building in simple Romanesque Style. It was built at the same time as the courthouse as the jailer's residence.  A brick two-story shallow hip roofed ell was added in 1926, to house the jail.

It was listed on the National Register of Historic Places in 1994.

References

County courthouses in West Virginia
Courthouses on the National Register of Historic Places in West Virginia
Romanesque Revival architecture in West Virginia
Government buildings completed in 1894
Buildings and structures in Pocahontas County, West Virginia
National Register of Historic Places in Pocahontas County, West Virginia